This is a list of years in Burkina Faso. For only articles about years in Burkina Faso that have been written, see :Category:Years in Burkina Faso.

Twenty-first century

Twentieth century

See also
 Timeline of Ouagadougou

Bibliography

External links
 
 . Initiated by Agence universitaire de la Francophonie

 
Burkina Faso-related lists
Burkina Faso